David Williams (1 March 1942 – 23 February 2015) was a Welsh professional footballer and coach. A full back, he joined Newport County from local club Nash United. He went on to make 306 league appearances for Newport scoring 2 goals between 1960 and 1973.

In 1988 Williams had a brief spell as team manager of Newport County until the arrival of Eddie May.

In September 2009 Williams was inducted to the Newport County Hall of Fame. He died at the age of 72 in 2015.

References

External links
 

Welsh footballers
Newport County A.F.C. players
Newport County A.F.C. managers
English Football League players
1942 births
2015 deaths
Association football fullbacks
Footballers from Newport, Wales
Welsh football managers